Eugene "Yaney" Rosenthal (August 5, 1914 – April 19, 2006) was an American professional basketball player. He played college basketball and football for Carnegie Mellon University. Rosenthal then played in the National Basketball League for the Pittsburgh Pirates during the 1938–39 season and averaged 3.3 points per game.

References

1914 births
2006 deaths
American men's basketball players
United States Navy personnel of World War II
Basketball players from Pittsburgh
Carnegie Mellon Tartans football players
Carnegie Mellon Tartans men's basketball players
Forwards (basketball)
Jewish men's basketball players
Pittsburgh Pirates (NBL) players